Good is a 2008 drama film based on the stage play of the same name by C. P. Taylor. It stars Viggo Mortensen, Jason Isaacs, and Jodie Whittaker, and was directed by Vicente Amorim. The film premiered at the Toronto International Film Festival on 8 September 2008.

Cast

Production
Producer Miriam Segal had wanted to turn C. P. Taylor's play into a film ever since she saw it in 1981. Good premiered in London in September 1981, with Alan Howard as John Halder, and transferred to Broadway in 1982. "I was simply overwhelmed by the play, and knew immediately I would do whatever was necessary to produce the film adaptation", Segal has stated.

In 2003, 22 years after the play's premiere, she finally secured the rights. Her former classmate, Jason Isaacs, signed on to be one of the film’s executive producers, and Viggo Mortensen, who had been very impressed by the play when visiting London as a young actor in 1981, agreed to play the lead. The film was shot entirely on location in Budapest in 2007.

Critical reception
The film was poorly received by critics, and its release was limited. On Rotten Tomatoes it has a 33% rating based on 72 reviews. The site's consensus reads: "Though ambitious, Good stumbles in the transition from stage to screen, and Mortensen's performance isn't enough to cover its flaws". 
Historian Frank McDonough praised the film, recommending it on the historical podcast 'We Have Ways of Making You Talk'.

See also
 Martin Heidegger - a Professor of Philosophy in Freiburg promoted to Rector under the Nazis
 Hannah Arendt - a student and lover of Martin Heidegger
 Edith Stein - a victim of the Holocaust who was murdered at Auschwitz, fellow protégée with Heidegger of the phenomenologist Edmund Husserl

References

External links
 

2008 films
2000s political drama films
British political drama films
German drama films
Hungarian drama films
English-language German films
English-language Hungarian films
Films shot in Budapest
Films set in the 1930s
Films set in Germany
Films about Nazi Germany
Films shot in Hungary
2008 drama films
2000s English-language films
2000s British films
2000s German films